The next parliamentary elections in Latvia will be held no later than 3 October 2026, following the end of the term of the 14th Saeima elected in 2022.

Opinion polls

2022

Notes

References 

Parliamentary elections in Latvia
Future elections in Europe
Latvia